Lotte Hollands (born 1981) is a Dutch mathematician and mathematical physicist who studies quantum field theory, supersymmetric gauge theory, and string theory. She is an associate professor and Royal Society Dorothy Hodgkin Fellow in the Department of Mathematics at Heriot-Watt University.

Early life 
Hollands was born in Maasbree, Netherlands.

Education 
Hollands earned her PhD at the University of Amsterdam in 2009.
Her dissertation, Topological Strings and Quantum Curves, was supervised by Robbert Dijkgraaf.

Hollands did her postdoctoral research with Sergei Gukov at the California Institute of Technology.

Career 
In 2013, Hollands became a research fellow at the University of Oxford. 
In 2015, Hollands became an associate professor at the Department of Math at  Heriot-Watt University.

Recognition
In 2018 the London Mathematical Society gave her their Anne Bennett Prize "in recognition of her outstanding research at the interface between quantum theory and geometry and of her leadership in mathematical outreach activities".

References

External links
Home page

Dutch mathematicians
Women mathematicians
Mathematical physicists
University of Amsterdam alumni
Academics of Heriot-Watt University
1981 births
Living people